Koon may refer to:

People:
 David Koon, New York politician
 Elaine Koon, Malaysian rhythmic gymnast
 Ella Koon, Hong Kong singer and actress
 Jason Koon (born 1985), American poker player
 Jonathan Koon, Chinese-American entrepreneur, artist, and fashion designer
 Larry Koon (1946-2012), American author
 Matthew Koon, English stage actor and dancer
 Stacey Koon, American policeman involved in the Rodney King incident
 Loi Ah Koon, founder of Ya Kun Kaya Toast
 Koon Wai Chee, Hong Kong badminton player 

Other uses
 12242 Koon, a minor planet
 Red hind (Epinephelus guttatus), a fish also known as koon in Trinidad
 Emarginula koon, a species of sea snail
 The fully anglicized form of the Taa language

See also
Koons (disambiguation)
Coon (disambiguation)